Kelly Daniel Dransfeldt (born April 16, 1975) is a former Major League Baseball shortstop for the Texas Rangers and Chicago White Sox. 

He is a graduate of Morris Community High School in Morris, Illinois, as a shortstop and infielder. He attended the University of Michigan, and in 1995 and 1996, he played collegiate summer baseball with the Falmouth Commodores of the Cape Cod Baseball League. He was drafted by the Texas Rangers in the 4th round of the 1996 Major League Baseball Draft.

He made his Major League debut on May 1, 1999, for the Texas Rangers. He hit .205 in his 51 major league games over the course of his 4-year major league career. After being granted free agency in 2004, Dransfeldt retired from baseball and focused on his other passion, the business world. He currently works as a stock portfolio advisor and gives in-depth market reports on local radio in Morris, Illinois, daily as a locally based stock market expert.

References

External links

Major League Baseball shortstops
Baseball players from Illinois
Hudson Valley Renegades players
Charlotte Rangers players
Tulsa Drillers players
Oklahoma RedHawks players
Louisville Bats players
Pawtucket Red Sox players
Charlotte Knights players
Texas Rangers players
Chicago White Sox players
1975 births
Living people
People from Morris, Illinois
Sportspeople from Joliet, Illinois
Michigan Wolverines baseball players
Falmouth Commodores players